Radibuš is a village in the municipality of Rankovce, North Macedonia.

History
Radibuš contains three archaeological sites within its boundaries, all dating for Late Antiquity.

In 1846, a teacher in Radibuš, Gjorgija Makedonski, wrote referring to his family that "we are Macedonians, but not Greeks" and that "we are Slavs from Macedonia".

Demographics
According to the 2002 census, the village had a total of 157 inhabitants. Ethnic groups in the village include:

Macedonians 156
Others 1

References

Villages in Rankovce Municipality